WZMH Architects is an architectural firm established in 1961 and based in Toronto, Ontario, Canada. Originally known as Webb Zerafa Menkès Housden (after Peter Webb, Boris Zerafa, René Menkès, and Warwick Housden) the company's name was changed to WZMH Architects in 2002.

The firm is known for its work with tall, landmark structures (including the CN Tower), skyscrapers, major mixed-use development, commercial, institutional, residential and hospitality projects, as well as renovation and retrofit projects involving heritage restoration, justice buildings and data centres.
In 2015, WZMH merged with retail design firm, pellow + associates.

The company working with Ryerson University (now Toronto Metropolitan University), has devised a concept for providing supplemental energy to buildings that are linked to a microgrid that would draw that energy captured from the testing of nearby data center generators. The company has come up with a concept to harness “wasted energy” from data centers by diverting it to residences and commercial buildings that are located near the data center to form a direct current microgrid-based community.

The next company's project with Ryerson University, The Ryerson University Smart Campus Integration and Testing Hub (SCITHub) will be the world’s first building that is 100 percent digitally enabled.

Awards 
Illuminating Engineering Society of North America:

2015: IES Illumination Award of Merit - Quinte Courthouse

International Council of Shopping Centre Awards:

2015: Gold ICSC within the New Development Category - Outlet Collection at Niagara and RBC WaterPark Place in Toronto

Canadian Urban Institute:

2013: CUI Brownie Award in the Excellence in Project Development at the Building Scale category – Nova Scotia Power Corporate Headquarters

Canada Green Building Council:

2013: Canadian Green Building Award- Nova Scotia Power Corporate Headquarters

Ontario Architect's Association Awards 
2014: OAA Design Excellence Award- Nova Scotia Power Corporate Headquarters

2012: OAA Award for Design Excellence- Bay Adelaide Centre West Tower

Notable projects 
222 Jarvis Street Sustainable Building Renewal, Toronto
Bay Adelaide Centre, Toronto
BCC Data Centre, Ontario
Caesars Windsor, Windsor
Canadian Embassy, Warsaw, Poland
Canadian Space Agency, St. Hubert, Quebec
Casino Rama, Rama, Ontario
Centennial Place, Calgary
CN Tower, Toronto
CSEC Long-Term Accommodation, Ottawa
Durham Region Courthouse, Oshawa
Harbour Centre, Vancouver
Exchange Place, Boston
Lester B. Pearson Building, Ottawa
Maplewood High School, Toronto
Marketplace Center, Boston
Ministry of Foreign Affairs, Abu Dhabi
Nile Plaza - Four Seasons Hotel, Cairo
Nile Ritz-Carlton, Cairo
Nova Scotia Power Corporate Headquarters, Halifax
Parkway Forest Re-Urbanization and Emerald City, Toronto
Public Institution for Social Security Headquarters (PIFFS), Kuwait
Quinte Courthouse, Belleville, Ontario
Royal Bank Plaza, Toronto
San Stefano Grand Plaza
Scotia Plaza, Toronto
Shanghai Securities Exchange Building, Shanghai
Tabor Park Vocational School (Jean Vanier Catholic Secondary School), Toronto
The Crossways, Toronto
WaterPark Place, Toronto

Gallery

References

External links
Company website

Architecture firms of Canada
Companies based in Toronto